The following is a list of writers living or residing in Malaysia ordered by their first name. This list includes writers of all genres and in any language.

This is a subsidiary list to the List of Malaysians.

A
Abdullah bin Abdul Kadir (1796–1854)
Abdullah Hussain (1920–2014)
Adibah Amin. Writer, columnist, teacher, and actress.
Amir Muhammad (born 1972)
A Samad Said (born 1935)

B 

 Bernice Chauly

D 
 Dina Zaman

E
Ee Tiang Hong (1933-1990), poet

F
Faisal Tehrani
Farish A. Noor (born 1967), political scientist and historian.
Fatimah Busu

H
Huzir Sulaiman
Zurinah Hassan

G
Chuah Guat Eng (born 1943). Malaysian Peranakan Chinese writer.

J
Khasnor Johan, historian

K
Khoo Kheng-Hor
Kee Thuan Chye

M
Mahathir Mohamad
Munshi Abdullah (1796–1854)

N
Kevin Nyiau
Noordin Hassan

O 

 Julya Oui

P
Preeta Samarasan

R 
Rahimidin Zahari
 Ramlee Awang Murshid
 Rani Manicka
 Rehman Rashid
Ruhaini Matdarin

S 
 Shahnon Ahmad, known as a National Laurate.
 Shih-Li Kow. Shortlisted for the Frank Frank O'Connor International Short Story Award
 Shirley Geok-Lin Lim (born 1944). Malaysia-born American writer.
 Stuart Danker, Malaysia-based author.
 Syed Husin Ali Professor, politician and author of nearly 20 books.
 Syed Hussein Alatas (1928-2007). Malaysian academician, sociologist, founder of social science organisations, and politician.

T
Tan Twan Eng. Shortlisted for the Booker Prize. Winner of the Man Asian Literary Prize and the Walter Scott Prize for Historical Fiction.
Tash Aw. Winner of the Costa Book Awards Best First Novel.
Tunku Halim. Writer and lawyer.

U
Usman Awang
Uthaya Sankar SB
[Uthaya kumari]

Z
Zainon Ismail C.N. Afghani

See also
List of Malaysian women writers
Malaysian literature

Lists of writers by nationality
 
Writers